Michał Boruciński (29 September 1885 – 21 April 1976) was a Polish painter. His work was part of the art competitions at the 1928 Summer Olympics and the 1932 Summer Olympics.

References

1885 births
1976 deaths
20th-century Polish painters
20th-century Polish male artists
Olympic competitors in art competitions
People from Siedlce
Polish male painters